(To Thee, Lord, to Thee will I surrender myself), WAB 12, is a sacred motet composed by Anton Bruckner in .

History 
Bruckner composed the motet in  either during his stay in Kronstorf or at the beginning of his stay in St. Florian Abbey. The original manuscript, on which the Tantum ergo, WAB 43 is also found, is in the archive of the St. Florian Abbey. The motet was first published in volume II/3, pp. 114–115 of the Göllerich/Auer biography.

Text 
{|
|
|style="padding-left:2em;"|To Thee, Lord, to Thee will I surrender myself, 
Thee, whose property I am. 
Thou alone, Thou art my life, 
and so death then becomes to me a gain. 
I live for Thee, I die for Thee, 
that Thou alone be mine, so am I fulfilled.
|}

This text, which was also used by Felix Mendelssohn in his oratorio Paulus, is based on the ninth verse of the hymn Herr Gott, du kennest meine Tage by Ludwig Rudolph von Senftt zu Pilsach over the Stoning of Stephen.

Music 
The 32-bar work in A major is a chorale for mixed choir a cappella.

As Crawford Howie writes, "both In jener letzten der Nächte WAB 17 and Dir, Herr, dir will ich mich ergeben WAB 12 for a cappella mixed-voice choir are chorale harmonizations, probably the result of his studies with Zenetti."

Selected discography 
There are only a few recordings of Dir, Herr, dir will ich mich ergeben:
 Balduin Sulzer,  Chor des Linzer Musikgymnasiums, Stiftskirche Wilhering - Geistliche Musik – CD: Preiserrecords 90052CD, 
 Thomas Kerbl, Chorvereinigung Bruckner 2011, Anton Bruckner: Lieder/Magnificat – CD: LIVA 046, 2011
 Philipp von Steinäcker, Vocalensemble Musica Saeculorum, Bruckner: Pange lingua - Motetten - CD: Fra Bernardo FB 1501271, 2015

References

Sources 
 August Göllerich, Anton Bruckner. Ein Lebens- und Schaffens-Bild,  – posthumous edited by Max Auer by G. Bosse, Regensburg, 1932
 Max Auer, Anton Bruckner als Kirchenmusiker, G. Bosse, Regensburg, 1927
 Anton Bruckner – Sämtliche Werke, Band XXI: Kleine Kirchenmusikwerke, Musikwissenschaftlicher Verlag der Internationalen Bruckner-Gesellschaft, Hans Bauernfeind and Leopold Nowak (Editor), Vienna, 1984/2001
 Cornelis van Zwol, Anton Bruckner 1824–1896 – Leven en werken, uitg. Thoth, Bussum, Netherlands, 2012. 
 Crawford Howie, Anton Bruckner - A documentary biography, online revised edition

External links 
 
  
 Dir, Herr, dir will ich mich ergeben, Choral A-Dur, WAB 12  Critical discography by Hans Roelofs 

There is also a transcription of the motet as Ave verum corpus: 
 Ave Verum Corpus - Anton Bruckner

Motets by Anton Bruckner
1845 compositions
Compositions in A major